The following buildings were added to the National Register of Historic Places as part of the Titusville Multiple Property Submission (or MPS).

Notes

 Brevard
National Register of Historic Places Multiple Property Submissions in Florida
Titusville, Florida